HMS Rugby was a Hunt class minesweeper of the Royal Navy from World War I. She was originally to be named HMS Filey, but this was changed to avoid any conflict between the vessel name and a coastal location.

See also
 Rugby, Warwickshire

References
 

 

Hunt-class minesweepers (1916)
Royal Navy ship names
1918 ships